Friedrich Gustav von Bramann (25 September 1854 – 21 April 1913) was a German surgeon born in Wilhelmsberg near Darkehmen, East Prussia.

He studied medicine at the University of Königsberg and joined the Corps Hansea. He became assistant surgeon to Ernst von Bergmann at the Charité in Berlin. In 1889 he declined the call to the University of Greifswald and became a senior lecturer at the Charité. In 1890 he was appointed professor (Ordinarius) of surgery at the University of Halle an der Saale, succeeding Richard von Volkmann

In 1887-88 he was attending surgeon to the Crown Prince Friedrich Wilhelm in San Remo. When Friedrich almost choked on a larynx cancer he encouraged Bramann to perform a tracheostomy. Bramann, known for his icy composure, did so and thus enabled the Prince to ascend to the throne in March 1888. When Friedrich died just three months later, the autopsy Bramann's emergency measure, disregarding the former assessment of Morell Mackenzie and Rudolf Virchow.

Bramann was known for his use of minimally invasive surgical practices and his pioneer work in neurosurgery. With neurologist Gabriel Anton, he researched suboccipital puncture and the "Balkenstich method" for treatment of hydrocephalus. The "Balkenstich method" was first introduced in 1908 by Bramann and Anton, and is a procedure in which the corpus callosum (a tract of white matter connecting the brain's two halves) is pierced for drainage of cerebrospinal fluid.

Bramann despised academic poly-writing and published only some dozens articles and papers.

He was knighted in 1891 and received high decorations for treating German princes and Turkish dignitaries.

Notes

References
 G. Anton: Zur Erinnerung a Fritz Gustav von Bramann. Münchner Medizinische Wochenschrift 60 (1913) 438-439
 M. P. Bläske: Fritz Gustav Bramann zum 150. Geburtstag. Mitteilungen der Kassenärztlichen Vereinigung Sachsen, 9/2004.
 Winfried Burkert: Der Chirurg Friedrich Gustav von Bramann: Der Retter des Kronprinzen. Halle (Saale), 2009.
 Catalogus-professorum-halensis (translated biography)
 Journal of Neurology, Neurosurgery, and Psychiatry 2005 – Gabriel Anton's (1858–1933) contribution to the history of neurosurgery

1854 births
1913 deaths
University of Königsberg alumni
Academic staff of the Martin Luther University of Halle-Wittenberg
German surgeons
German neurosurgeons
Physicians of the Charité